Roman Sergeyevich Badanin (born 1 January 1970) is a Russian journalist and researcher. He is the founder and editor in chief of the Proekt media outlet, former digital platform editor in chief of Forbes Russia, former editor in chief of the Dozhd TV channel and the RBK news agency. He is a Senior JSK Fellow at Stanford University.

Early life 
Badanin was born on 1 January 1970. He graduated from the Faculty of History, Moscow State University.

Career 
Badanin was engaged in research activities at the Russian Academy of Sciences and the Gorbachev Foundation, a Russian think tank.

In 1996, Badanin began to work at the Izvestia newspaper.

In 2001, he started working for the Gazeta.Ru newspaper as a news editor. In 2011, while being the head of the policy department and deputy editor in chief, resigned due to disagreements between him and the editor-in-chief of the newspaper. Two weeks before the 2011 Russian legislative election, the newspaper received an order to place an advertisement for the ruling political party United Russia, and Badanin was against it, because the advertisement required the newspaper to remove existing banners of the Movement for Defence of Voters' Rights "Golos" and the "Violations map" project, which tracked violations in the elections and in the voting results.

From December 2011 to 26 August 2013, he was the editor in chief of the Forbes.ru website. In this position, he was responsible for the integration of the magazine and the digital platform. According to the Kommersant newspaper, Badanin left because of disagreements with the then general director of the publishing house Axel Springer Russia.

On 14 October 2013, it became known that Badanin was appointed executive director of the Internet Projects Service of the Interfax news agency.

On 15 January 2014, he began working as editor in chief of the RBK news agency. Badanin was one of the authors of the RBK's investigation about one of the daughters of Russian president Vladimir Putin, Katerina Tikhonova, and her then husband Kirill Shamalov. On 13 May 2016, Badanin quit due to pressure from Russian officials. After his resignation, more than twenty key journalists also left the agency.

On 25 July 2016, Badanin was appointed editor in chief of the Dozhd TV channel. He was one of the authors of Dozhd's reportage about the Russian businessman and criminal , after which a criminal libel case was initiated.

In 2017, Badanin flew to the United States to study at Stanford University under the programme John S. Knight Journalism Fellowships at Stanford.

In 2018, he founded the Proekt media outlet, which specializes in investigative journalism. Proekt was closed in 2021 after being listed as an undesirable organization, and Badanin left Russia for his safety.

On September 6, 2021, he founded the investigative online media outlet Agentstvo ("Agency").

Awards and honours 
 Eight-time winner of Redkollegia journalism award.
 2019 "Journalism as a Profession" award in the Interview with Pictures category.
 2022 Prize for the Freedom and Future of the Media by Media Foundation of Sparkasse Leipzig.

References 

1970 births
TV Rain
Living people
Media executives
21st-century Russian journalists
20th-century Russian journalists
Russian male journalists
Russian investigative journalists
Russian television journalists
Russian newspaper editors
People listed in Russia as media foreign agents
Journalism as a Profession Awards winners
Redkollegia award winners
21st-century Russian historians